Jo Röpcke (4 October 1928 – 25 May 2007) was a Belgian film critic, film journalist, director and television host.

Career
For over more than 30 years, starting from the 1960s, Röpcke presented the film magazine show Premiere on BRT, the publicly funded state television channel for the Flanders region of Belgium. Röpcke was known for a dry but charming presentation style with critical, and sometimes humorous or ironic side remarks.

Röpcke also gained an international profile as a film journalist and critic. He was a researcher at the Université libre de Bruxelles (ULB) between 1953 and 1958 and at the RUG University in Ghent from 1958 until 1962. He was professor of film analysis and rector at the Brussels' film school the Royal Institute for Theatre, Cinema and Sound (RITCS), and president of the Film Festival of Brussels (BE).

Work as  TV director
The BRT-news (VRT)
Echo, BRT, (VRT)
Panorama, TV documentary show (BRT)
Zoeklicht, cultural show (BRT)

References

External links
De Standaard
De Tijd

Belgian film critics
Flemish journalists
1928 births
2007 deaths
Belgian television presenters
Flemish television presenters
Belgian television directors
Flemish television directors
20th-century Belgian journalists